Gilad or Ghil'ad may refer to:

People

Given name
 Ghil'ad Zuckermann (born 1971), linguist and revivalist
 Gilad Atzmon (born 1963), Israeli-born British jazz saxophonist
 Gilad Bloom (born 1967), Israeli professional tennis player
 Gilad Bracha, software engineer
 Gilad Erdan (born 1970), Israeli politician
 Gilad Hesseg (born 1971), Israeli folk rock singer-songwriter and composer
 Gilad Hochman (born 1982), Israeli classical music composer
 Gilad Janklowicz (born 1954), fitness guru
 Gilad Kariv (born 1973), Israeli attorney
 Gilad Karni, Israeli violist
 Gilad Shaer, 16-year-old killed in the 2014 kidnapping and murder of Israeli teenagers
 Gilad Shalit (born 1986), Israeli soldier

Surname 
 Amos Gilad (1941–2010), Israeli Olympic runner
 Avri Gilad (born 1962), Israeli media personality
 Benjamin Gilad, pioneer in the field of competitive Intelligence
 Yehuda Gilad (musician), professor of clarinet at the Colburn School of music
 Yehuda Gilad (politician) (born 1955), former Israeli politician
 Zrubavel Gilad (1912–1988), Hebrew poet, editor and translator

Places 
 Havat Gilad, Israeli settlement outpost in the West Bank
 Ramat Gilad, village and an Israeli settlement in the West Bank
 Gilád, the Hungarian name for Ghilad Commune, Timiș County, Romania

See also
 Ghilad, a commune in Timiș County, Romania
Gilead (disambiguation)